Kingston Mills, located approximately   north of downtown Kingston, Ontario, is the southernmost lockstation and one of 24 lockstations of the Rideau Canal system. Kingston Mills is a component of the Rideau Canal National Historic Site, and along with the rest of the Rideau Canal, is a World Heritage Site. The site is managed and operated by Parks Canada.

History

Kingston Mills developed because of a series of falls (known as Cataraqui Falls) on the Cataraqui River. In 1784, a grist mill and saw mill were built by the British government on the falls to serve the residents of the growing Loyalist settlement at Cataraqui, now Kingston.  Under orders from Major John Ross who was in charge of the Cataraqui settlement, Lieutenant David Brass of Butler's Rangers built a road to the falls from Cataraqui. This was the first road built in Upper Canada. "King's Mill", the area's original name, became a major location for settlers to bring produce. Several mills were built over the years; the structures were often damaged by fire or water, or left abandoned.

After the War of 1812 Kingston's naval base on Point Frederick was deemed vulnerable to American attack. Since Kingston Mills was considered to be better protected from attack because of its inland position, land was acquired and surveyed at Kingston Mills for a naval stores depot with accompanying fortifications. The depot was never built, however, since British priorities changed from improving Kingston's naval infrastructure to building military fortifications around Kingston.

Beginning in 1827, the site was cleared to begin building locks for the Rideau Canal. The locks would enable boats to bypass the falls. Four locks (Nos. 46, 47, 48, and 49) were constructed, all of which have a lift of 3.6 metres.

A defensive blockhouse was constructed beginning in 1832. It housed militia and British regular troops from 1838 to 1841. It is one of four situated along the Rideau Canal. The blockhouse has been restored to the condition it may have looked like in the 1830s.

In 1853 a wooden railway bridge was built by the Grand Trunk Railroad over the lower locks. The Canadian National Railway replaced this bridge with a steel bridge in 1929.

Since 1909, several bridges over the canal along Kingston Mills Road have been constructed and replaced. The last bridge, a steel swing bridge, was built in 1988.

In 1914 a hydroelectric power generating station was built. The generating station is still in operation.

Other structures that were built at Kingston Mills include storage barns, stables, railway buildings, living quarters, and the lockstation office, which was once a store house. The only buildings still existing, other than the generating station and the blockhouse, are the lockstation office and the original lockmaster's house which is now a visitor centre known as Lockmaster Anglin's Visitor Centre.

Kingston Mills was designated a National Historic Site in 1925, and a World Heritage Site in 2007.

In 2009, four women were found dead in a car underwater at Kingston Mills. It was determined that the four had been  murdered. Family members of the deceased were convicted.

Recreation 
The Rideau Canal, of which Kingston Mills is a part, is a recreational waterway, catering to pleasure craft. Boaters may travel between Kingston and Ottawa. Boat tours along the canal are also provided.

Kingston Mills offers a location for picnicking, fishing, swimming, walking, and rock climbing during the warm months. A rock climbing location has been developed at the southwest end of the locks. Many routes have been set including ones for top roping, lead climbing, trad climbing, and bouldering.

References
Notes

Bibliography

 Kingston Mills Lockstation Retrieved 2012-01-30
 History of the Rideau Lockstations - Kingston Mills Locks 46-49  Retrieved 2012-01-30
 Canadian Environmental Assessment Agency - Kingston Mills Fixed Bridge Reconstruction Retrieved 2012-01-31
 The Anglin Family Story Retrieved 2012-02-02
 The Rideau Route, Section 4 Retrieved 2012-02-05
Armstrong, Alvin. Buckskin to Broadloom - Kingston Grows Up. Kingston Whig-Standard, 1973. No ISBN.
Osborne, Brian S. and Donald Swainson. Kingston, Building on the Past for the Future. Quarry Heritage Books, 2011.

External links
 Rideau Canal Waterway - Kingston Mills Locks 46-49
 Rock Climbing Routes in Kingston Mills
 Parks Canada - Rideau Canal - Kingston Mills Lockstation
 A Rideau Panorama
 Canada's Historic Places - The Lockmaster's House
 Ontario Guide - Kingston Mills Rideau Canal Locks, Photos, Ontario Canada

Geography of Kingston, Ontario
Rideau Canal
Parks in Kingston, Ontario